Telanthophora is a genus of Mesoamerican plants in the groundsel tribe within the daisy family.

 Species
 Telanthophora arborescens (Steetz) H.Rob. & Brettell - Panamá, El Salvador, Costa Rica, Oaxaca, Veracruz
 Telanthophora bartlettii H.Rob. & Brettell - Belize
 Telanthophora cobanensis (J.M.Coult.) H.Rob. & Brettell - Oaxaca, Chiapas, Guatemala, Belize, El Salvador, Honduras, Nicaragua
 Telanthophora grandifolia (Less.) H.Rob. & Brettell - Veracruz, Oaxaca, Chiapas, Guatemala, Belize, El Salvador, Honduras, Nicaragua, Costa Rica, Panamá
 Telanthophora serraquitchensis (Greenm.) H.Rob. & Brettell - Chiapas, El Salvador
 formerly included
see Senecio and Villasenoria

References

External links
 Strange Wonderful Things.com:  Telanthophora grandifolia, Dinosaur Dinner — with photos.

Senecioneae
Asteraceae genera
Flora of Central America
Flora of Mexico